This is a list of notable past students and staff of Brighton Grammar School. Alumni of the school are known as "Brighton Grammarians".

A

 William Adamson — grain merchant, Brighton City councillor (1897-1913), Brighton City Mayor (1901-1902), Member of the Victorian Legislative Council (1910-1922).
Dylan Alcott – Paralympian.
 Francis Henry Joseph Archer — headmaster at Caulfield Grammar School 1923-1954, teacher at Brighton Grammar School 1955-1957.
Sir Stanley Argyle KBE – Former Premier of Victoria; Member (Nationalist) for the seat of Toorak.

B

 Gerry Balme — VFL footballer with St Kilda.
 Brigadier Lewis Ernest Stephen Barker,  — Australian Army officer.
Andrew Bassat — co-founder of SEEK. 
Paul Bassat — co-founder of SEEK.
Marcus Bastiaan — businessman; former vice-president of the Victorian Division of the Liberal Party.
 Weston Bate — member of staff.
Robin Batterham AO — chemical engineer; Chief Scientist of Australia 1999-2006.
Mordy Bromberg — Federal Court judge, and VFL footballer with St Kilda.
Travis Brooks – Olympic hockey player.
Louis Butler (footballer) – AFL Footballer

C

Ben Canham — Australian representative rower
 Bill Cannon — VFL footballer with St Kilda.
Warwick Capper – AFL footballer
 Sir Norman John Carson — businessman, wool industry leader, philanthropist.
 James Catanach - RAAF pilot, taken prisoner during the Second World War, took part in the 'Great Escape' from Stalag Luft III in March 1944, was re-captured and subsequently shot by the Gestapo.
 Air Vice Marshal Hugh Vivian Champion de Crespigny,  — Royal Flying Corps pilot in First World War, and senior Royal Air Force officer during Second World War.
 Sir Harold Winthrop Clapp KBE — railway administrator, Director-General of Australia's Land Transport Board, 1942-1951.
Josh Clayton – AFL footballer
Andrew Cooper – Olympic rower.
 George Henry Crowther - founder, and first headmaster  of Brighton Grammar School.
 Henry Arnold Crowther - second headmaster  of Brighton Grammar School.

D

 Roger Davies — artist manager, business manager, and music producer.
Chris Dawes – AFL footballer.
Lt. Col Sir Constantine Trent Champion de Crespigny — soldier, medical practitioner, pathologist, academic, and hospital administrator.
 John Leopold Denman — member of dynasty of architects
 Neil Douglas MBE – Environmental artist; Conservationist; Author.
Barry Robert Dove – Judge of the County Court of Victoria.
John Robertson Duigan and Reginald Duigan — Australian pioneer aviators who built and flew the first Australian-made aircraft..

E

F
 Horace Percy Finnis — Anglican priest, and organist.

G

William Grant CMG, DSO and Bar, VD – Soldier and commander of the 4th Light Horse Brigade at the Battle of Beersheba.

H

 William Hancock — vicar at St Andrew's Church, Brighton (1918-1928), instrumental in acquiring Brighton Grammar School for the Anglican Church in 1924, and chairman of the School's council (1925-1935).
The Honourable Justice Kim Hargrave – Justice of the Supreme Court of Victoria Court of Appeal.
 Ray Harper — VFL footballer with St Kilda, Carlton, and North Melbourne.
 Clifford Hayes — Member of the Victorian Legislative Council.
Sir Lionel Hooke – Pioneer in radio; Wireless operator in Ernest Shackleton's Imperial Antarctic Expedition; Engineer.
Jayden Hunt – AFL footballer
Neville Read Hudson  — RAAF pilot, Member of the Victorian Legislative Assembly (1976-1979).

I

 Peter Isaacson  AM, DFC, AFC, DFM — publisher and decorated military pilot.

J

Ben Jacobs — AFL footballer.
 Christian Jollie Smith — solicitor, co-founder of the Communist Party of Australia, taught English Literature at Brighton Grammar School (1919).

K
Josh Kelly — AFL footballer.

L
Andrew Lauterstein – Olympic swimmer.
 Cyril Lloyd — a senior British Army officer during the Second World War.
 Brigadier John Lloyd  — senior Australian Army officer who fought in the First and Second World Wars, farmer, and licensing magistrate.
Matthew Lloyd – Olympic cyclist.
 Corbett Lyon — architect, art patron and academic.

M

 Craig Marais — international field hockey player.
Mat McBriar – American football player.
 Michael McCarthy — member of staff, VFL footballer.
William C. McClelland – doctor, VFL footballer and Victorian Football League President.
Andrew McGrath AFL footballer.
John Charles McIntyre – Former Anglican Bishop of the Diocese of Gippsland, Victoria; Recipient of the Centenary Medal 2003 (also attended Fort Street High School).
 Brad McKay – Doctor, author and television personality.
 Claude McKay — journalist, newspaper proprietor.
 Samuel McLaren — mathematician, mathematical physicist, killed in action during the Battle of the Somme.
Professor Ian Meredith AM – Interventional Cardiologist, Director of MonashHeart, Professor of Cardiology at Monash University.
Gary Minihan – Olympian, Commonwealth Medal Winner, Australian Record Holder (since 1984).
 Roy Morgan — pollster, market researcher, and Melbourne City councillor 1959-1974.
Nathan Murphy – AFL footballer

N

 Lieutenant-Colonel James Joachim Nicholas M.B.B.S., M.D. — VFL footballer, killed in action in World War I.

O
 Sean O'Boyle — composer and conductor.
 Bill O'Hara — surgeon, VFL footballer with St Kilda.
James Ryan O'Neill (born Leigh Anthony Bridgart in 1947), convicted murderer and suspected serial killer

P

 Roy Paton — farmer, President Towong Shire Council (1929-1930, 1932-1933), Member of the Victorian Legislative Assembly (1932-1947).
 Alexander Augustus Norman Dudley "Jerry" Pentland,  — aviator, World War I fighter ace.
 Archie Perkins — AFL footballer with Essendon.
Charlie Pickering – Australian comedian, television and radio presenter, author and producer, and host of The Weekly with Charlie Pickering.
 Andrew Plympton — businessman, sports administrator, President St Kilda Football Club 1993-2000.
 Sir Sir Murray Victor Porter – Member of the Victorian Legislative Assembly.
 Harry Potter — Rugby Union footballer with UK team Leicester Tigers.
Will Pucovski — cricketer.

Q

R

Peter Reith – Australian politician (Liberal); Minister Howard Government 1996–2003; Member for the seat of Flinders.
 John Ross — Member of thw Victorian Legislative Council (1996-2002).
Michael Rozenes QC – Chief judge of the County Court of Victoria.

S

Christian Salem – AFL footballer.
Jack Shelton — VFL footballer with St Kilda and South Melbourne; killed in action at Tobruk in 1941.
David Shepherd — Victorian cricketer, and VFL footballer with St Kilda.
Tommy Smith — international racing driver.
David Smorgon  — Australian businessman and member of the Smorgon family.
 Major General Victor Stantke,  — senior officer in the Australian Army during the First World War and Second World War, member of staff.
 Ivan Stedman — swimmer, silver medal in the 4×200-metre freestyle relay at the 1920 Summer Olympics in Antwerp, Belgium.
 Jock Sturrock MBE — yachtsman.

T

 Herbert Valentine Tarte — Fiji-born planter, and Member of the Victorian Legislative Council.
Peter Thomson — influential Anglican priest.
Albert Thurgood – VFL footballer.
Will Thursfield – AFL footballer
 Brigadier Raymond Walter Tovell – Distinguished soldier, Member of the Victorian Legislative Assembly.

U

V
 Jim Vickers-Willis — journalist, and square dance caller.

W
.
 Sam Walsh AO — businessman, philanthropist.
 Doug Warbrick — co-founder Rip Curl.
Matthew Warnock – AFL footballer
Robert Warnock – AFL footballer
Jack Watts – AFL footballer, No.1 Draft pick 2008.
 Charles William George Wheeler – Master of the Supreme Court of Victoria.
 Julien Wiener — Australian Test cricketer.
 Harry Williams — golfer, Australian Amateur Champion in 1931 and 1937.
David Wittey – AFL footballer

X

Y
 Masa Yamaguchi — professional actor on stage and in film.

Z
 Allan Zavod — pianist, composer, jazz musician, and conductor.
 Charles Henry Zercho — VFA footballer with Essendon (1890), chaplain and resident master at Brighton Grammar School (1891-1892, and 1911-1913).

Notes

External links
 Brighton Grammar School website
 The Brighton Grammar School Hall of Fame 
 Old Brighton Grammarians Society (alumni association)
 Old Brighton Grammarians Football Club (Victorian Amateur Football Association)

Brighton Grammar
 
Brighton Grammar
Brighton Grammar
 List